Kichi-Aydarken is a village in Batken Region of Kyrgyzstan. It is part of the Kadamjay District. Its population was 1,204 in 2021. It lies adjacent to the east of the city Aydarken.

References

Populated places in Batken Region